David Franz Schoenbrun (March 15, 1915 – May 23, 1988) was an American broadcast journalist.

Biography
Schoenbrun was born in New York City in 1915.  He began his career teaching French.

Schoenbrun enlisted in the Army in 1943 and became a World War II correspondent covering North Africa through to the liberation of France, for which he was decorated with the Croix de Guerre and the Legion of Honour. Schoenbrun was recruited to Camp Ritchie for his knowledge of French and is considered to be one of the Ritchie Boys.

After the war, from 1947 to 1964, Schoenbrun worked for CBS, serving primarily as the network's bureau chief in Paris, where he met and interviewed the President Charles de Gaulle a number of times.  He was one of the reporters known as Murrow's Boys.

In 1959, at the age of 44, Schoenbrun received the Alfred I. duPont Award.

From the 1960s through the 1980s, Schoenbrun served as a news analyst for WNEW Radio in New York (now WBBR) and other Metromedia broadcast properties, and later for crosstown WPIX Television and its Independent Network News operation. In the mid-1970s, he served as a foreign affairs analyst for a short-lived public television channel in Los Angeles.

Schoenbrun is the author of On and Off the Air, a personal account of the history of CBS News through the 1970s.  Schoenbrun also wrote several books concerning World-War-II-era France and other works drawn from his experiences as a newsman.

Schoenbrun died of a heart attack in New York City, at the age of 73.

Bibliography

See also
 Appeal of June 18

References

External links

1915 births
1988 deaths
American radio journalists
American television journalists
American reporters and correspondents
American broadcast news analysts
American male journalists
United States Army personnel of World War II
Ritchie Boys